Valeria D'Obici (born 17 April 1952) is an Italian film and television actress.

Born in Lerici, Valeria D'Obici debuted in 1974 in the "poliziottesco" La polizia ha le mani legate. Her breakout role was the ugly Fosca in Ettore Scola's Passion of Love (1981); for this role she was awarded with a David di Donatello for Best Actress.

Awards
 1981 David di Donatello for Best Actress, winner - Passion of Love
 1982 David di Donatello for Best Supporting Actress, nominee - Piso Pisello
 1984 David di Donatello for Best Supporting Actress, nominee - A Proper Scandal
 1988 San Remo Film Festival, Best Actress, winner - La rosa bianca

References

External links 
 

Italian film actresses
1952 births
Italian television actresses
Italian stage actresses
David di Donatello winners
People from La Spezia
Living people
20th-century Italian actresses